Smile is an album by British rock band Ride.  It is a compilation of Ride's first two EPs, Ride and Play, both of which were originally released in the first half of 1990.   The album was first released by Sire Records in July 1990 for the North American market, in lieu of the two original British EPs.  Two years later, on 23 November 1992, it was released in the UK.

Track listing

References

External links

Smile at YouTube (streamed copy where licensed)

Ride (band) albums
1990 compilation albums
Sire Records compilation albums